Berkant Güner (born 19 February 1998) is a Turkish footballer who currently plays as a midfielder for Finnish side VPS.

Career
At the end of December 2019, FC Gütersloh 2000 confirmed the signing of Güner.

Career statistics

Club

Notes

References

1998 births
Living people
German footballers
Turkish footballers
Turkish expatriate footballers
Association football midfielders
Arminia Bielefeld players
Borussia Dortmund players
Eintracht Braunschweig players
Eintracht Braunschweig II players
Vaasan Palloseura players
FC Gütersloh 2000 players
Veikkausliiga players
Turkish expatriate sportspeople in Finland
Expatriate footballers in Finland